Helkath may refer to:

The star Kappa Ophiuchi
Helkath, a location on the boundary of the Tribe of Asher mentioned in the Book of Joshua.